Yuki, Yūki or Yuuki may refer to:

Places 
 Yuki, Hiroshima (Jinseki), a town in Jinseki District, Hiroshima, Japan
 Yuki, Hiroshima (Saeki), a town in Saeki District, Hiroshima, Japan
 Yūki, Ibaraki, a city on Honshu island in Japan
 Yuki, Tokushima, a town in Kaifu District, Japan
 Yuki, North Korea, now officially called 'Sonbong', a sub-division of the North Korean city of Rason

People 
 Yuki (given name), including a list of people named Yuki or Yūki
 Yūki clan, a clan in 14th century Japan
 Yuki people, an indigenous people of northwestern California
 Yuqui people, also spelled Yuki, an indigenous people of Bolivia
 Yu~ki, a 1990s bassist of Malice Mizer

Family name 
 Yūki (surname), Japanese surname (etc.)
 Hiroe Yuki (1948–2011), Japanese badminton player
 Kaori Yuki, manga artist active since 1987

Characters 
 Yuki-onna, a character in Japanese folklore
 Asuna Yuuki, a character in the Sword Art Online light novel series
 Mikan Yuuki, a character in theTo Love Ru manga series
 Yuki (King of Fighters), a character in The King of Fighters video game series
 Yuki (The Last Blade), a character in The Last Blade video game series
 Yuki (Neo Geo Battle Coliseum), a character in the Neo Geo Battle Coliseum video game
 Yuki Cross, a character in the Vampire Knight manga series
 Yuki Funahara, a character in the Psycho-Pass anime series
 Yuuki Konno, a character in the Sword Art Online light novel series
 Yuki Maeda, the Ultimate Lucky Student, from Danganronpa Another: Another Despair Academy.
 Yuki Nagato, a character in the Haruhi Suzumiya light novel series
 Yuki Soma (Fruits Basket), a character from the Fruits Basket manga series
 Yuki Takeya, a character in the School-Live! manga series
 Yūki Terumi, a character in the BlazBlue video game series
 Eiri Yuki, a character in the Gravitation manga series
 Judai Yuki, known as Jaden Yuki in the English dub, a character in the Yu-Gi-Oh! Duel Monsters GX anime series
 Ringo Yuuki, a character in theTo Love Ru manga series
 Rito Yuuki, a character in theTo Love Ru manga series
 Saibai Yuuki, a character in theTo Love Ru manga series
 Setsu Yuuki, known as Dylan Yuki in the English anime dub, a character in the Mirmo de Pon! manga series
 Yukiteru Amano, nicknamed Yuki, a character in the Future Diary manga series
 Yuki, a snow-white cat in The Cat Returns film
 Yuki Minakami, a character in the Wonderful Everyday visual novel.

Other uses 
 Yuki Enterprise, former name of Examu, a Japanese video game company
 Yuki language, an extinct language of California
Yuuki, Japanese musician and member of Chai

See also 
 Yūki Domain, a Japanese domain of the Edo period, located in Shimōsa Province
 Yuki Ito (disambiguation)
 Yuki Kato (disambiguation)
 Yuki Saito (disambiguation)
 Yuki Sato (disambiguation)
 Yuki Station (disambiguation)
 Yukie (disambiguation)
 Yukio
 Yukigassen, a snowball fighting-competition from Japan
 Yukimura, a Japanese family and given name